Two referendums were held in Liechtenstein in 1968. The first was held on 4 July on the question of introducing women's suffrage. Separate votes were held for men and women, with the men voting against, and women split almost equally, resulting in it being rejected by 54.5% of voters overall. The second referendum was held on 6 October on abolishing the tax on alcoholic drinks. It was rejected by 56.3% of voters.

A second referendum on women's suffrage was held in 1971 in which only men were allowed to vote. It also resulted in a "no" vote.

Results

Women's suffrage

Removal of alcoholic drinks tax

References

1968 referendums
1968 in Liechtenstein
Referendums in Liechtenstein
Women's suffrage in Liechtenstein
1968 in women's history